Eugene Jones may refer to:

Eugene Jones (baseball) (1922–1960), American baseball player
Eugene Kinckle Jones, co-founder of Alpha Phi Alpha fraternity at Cornell University
Eugene Jones (Torchwood), fictional character
Eugene S. Jones, filmmaker on A Face of War

See also
Gene Jones (disambiguation)